Ameiva nodam is a species of teiid lizard endemic to Peru.

References

Ameiva
Reptiles described in 2013
Lizards of South America
Reptiles of Peru
Taxa named by Claudia Koch
Taxa named by Pablo J. Venegas
Taxa named by Dennis Rödder
Taxa named by Morris Flecks
Taxa named by Wolfgang Böhme (herpetologist)